Scincella palnica is a species of skink found in India (Travancore, Anaimalai, Palni Hills, Coimbatore, and Madras Presidency).

References
 Boettger, O. 1892 Listen von Kriechtieren und Lurchen aus dem tropischen Asien und aus Papuasien. Ber. Tät. Offenb. Ver. Nat., Offenbach, 29 - 32: 65 - 164
 Eremchenko, V. K & I. Das 2004 Kaestlea: a new genus of scincid lizards (ScincidaLygosominae) from the Western Ghats, south-western India. Hamadryad 28 (1&2): 43-50
 Smith,M.A. 1937 A review of the genus Lygosoma (ScincidaReptilia) and its allies. Rec. Ind. Mus. 39 (3): 213-234

Scincella